Covering may refer to:

 Window covering, material used to cover a window
 Cover (topology), a collection of subsets of  whose union is all of 
 Covering (martial arts), an act of protecting against an opponent's strikes
 The Covering, a studio album by American Christian heavy metal/hard rock band Stryper
  Covering: The Hidden Assault on Our Civil Rights, a 2006 book by Kenji Yoshini

See also
 
 
 Covering a base, in baseball
 Covering sickness, a disease of horses and other members of the family Equidae
 Coverage (disambiguation)
 Cover (disambiguation)
 Covering theorem (disambiguation)